Edward How was an Anglican Archdeacon in Ireland in the late 17th-century.

How was born in County Armagh and  educated at Trinity College, Dublin. He was  Commonwealth Minister at  Charlemont, County Armagh from 1658;  and Archdeacon of Clogher  from 1661 until his death in 1682.

References

17th-century Irish Anglican priests
People from County Armagh
Archdeacons of Clogher
Alumni of Trinity College Dublin
1682 deaths